Thomas-Laurent Bédard (February 3, 1747 May 27, 1795) was a priest, educator and the superior of the Séminaire of Quebec. He was a brother of Jean-Baptiste Bédard.

References 
 

1747 births
1795 deaths
18th-century Canadian Roman Catholic priests